Scott Michael Barnes (born September 5, 1987), is an American former professional baseball pitcher. He has played in Major League Baseball (MLB) for the Cleveland Indians.

Amateur career
Barnes attended Cathedral High School in Springfield, Massachusetts, and St. John's University in New York City before being drafted by the San Francisco Giants.

In 2007 while at St. John's, Barnes was named to the first team all-Big East Conference team. After the 2007 season, he played collegiate summer baseball with the Harwich Mariners of the Cape Cod Baseball League.

Professional career

Cleveland Indians
In July 2009, the Giants traded Barnes to the Cleveland Indians for Ryan Garko.

In 2009, Barnes helped the Akron Aeros win the 2009 Eastern League Championship Series.

The Indians purchased Barnes' contract on November 18, 2011. Barnes was recalled by the Indians on May 30, 2012; he made his major-league debut that evening.

Baltimore Orioles
On November 26, 2014, Barnes was traded to the Baltimore Orioles for cash considerations.

Texas Rangers
The Texas Rangers claimed Barnes off waivers on December 8.

Toronto Blue Jays
The Rangers designated him for assignment on December 16, and he was claimed by the Toronto Blue Jays on December 23. The Blue Jays outrighted Barnes to the Buffalo Bisons of the Triple-A International League on March 27, 2015. He elected free agency on November 6, 2015.

Chicago Cubs
On December 23, 2015, Barnes signed a minor league deal with the Chicago Cubs organization. Barnes spent 2016 with the Iowa Cubs where he posted a 1–3 record with a 7.02 ERA. He became a free agent on November 7, 2016.

Chicago Dogs
On May 9, 2018, Barnes signed with the Chicago Dogs of the independent American Association. He was released on August 29, 2018.

References

External links

1987 births
Living people
Baseball players from Springfield, Massachusetts
Major League Baseball pitchers
Cleveland Indians players
St. John's Red Storm baseball players
Harwich Mariners players
Columbus Clippers players
Akron Aeros players
Kinston Indians players
San Jose Giants players
Augusta GreenJackets players
Salem-Keizer Volcanoes players
Arizona League Giants players
Peoria Javelinas players
Arizona League Indians players
New Hampshire Fisher Cats players
Buffalo Bisons (minor league) players
Chicago Dogs players